Dobrujans refer to the population of various ethnicities inhabiting or having inhabited the region of Dobruja in Romania and Bulgaria, for example:
 Dobrujan Bulgarians
 Dobrujan Germans
 Dobrujan Tatars
 Dobrujan Turks